WAGS (1380 AM) was a radio station in Bishopville, South Carolina. Prior to shutting down, the station aired a country music format. WAGS was owned by Beaver Communications.

On March 1, 2018, WAGS went off the air, with the intent of turning in the station's license to the FCC, barring a purchase offer. The station's license was surrendered on March 7, 2019, and cancelled by FCC on March 12, 2019.

See also
WLLH Boston area station which went on the air in 1926 as WAGS

References

External links
FCC Station Search Details: DWAGS (Facility ID: 9105)
FCC History Cards for WAGS (covering 1951-1979)
 

AGS
1954 establishments in South Carolina
Radio stations disestablished in 2019
2019 disestablishments in South Carolina
Defunct radio stations in the United States
Radio stations established in 1954
AGS
AGS